Aphrodisium griffithi, the Veined Capricornbeetle, is a species of round-necked longhorn beetles of the subfamily Cerambycinae.

Description
Head, prothorax, antennae and legs are reddish brown. Elytra are violaceous black, with dark brown tomentum and show two transversal fulvous bands.

Distribution
This species can be found in Vietnam.

References
 Biolib
 Cerambycidae Catalog
 Discover Life
 Charles Joseph Gahan - THE FAUNA OF BRITISH INDIA, CEYLON AND BURMA. Vol. I

Callichromatini
Beetles described in 1840